Aleksandr Vladimirovich Ovsyannikov (born 8 August 1974) is a former Russian professional footballer.

Club career
He made his professional debut in the Russian Second Division in 1993 for FC Iskra Smolensk. He played 1 game in the UEFA Intertoto Cup 1998 for FC Baltika Kaliningrad.

References

1974 births
Footballers from Voronezh
Living people
Russian footballers
Association football forwards
Russian Premier League players
FC Fakel Voronezh players
FC Baltika Kaliningrad players
FC Rubin Kazan players
FC Salyut Belgorod players
FC Ural Yekaterinburg players
FC Metallurg Lipetsk players
FC Iskra Smolensk players